Andropogon gayanus. commonly known as gamba grass, Rhodesian blue grass, tambuki grass, and other names, is a species of grass native to most of the tropical and subtropical savannas of Africa.

History and naming
Andropogon gayanus was recognised and named by 1833. Its common names include gamba grass, bluestem (Africa, Australia);  Rhodesian andropogon (southern Africa);  Rhodesian blue grass (Zimbabwe);  onga, tambuki grass                (north-west Africa); and sadabahar (India).

Description

It produces large numbers of light, fluffy seeds (up to 244,000 seeds each year, with 65% viability), which can be spread by wind, animals or machinery. It spreads rapidly where vegetation is disturbed, but most seeds fall within  of the parent plant.

Habitat
The grass is native to most of the tropical and subtropical savannas of Africa, also extending southwards into Mozambique, Botswana, Namibia and South Africa in regions with long dry seasons. However it does not do well where mean minimum temperatures dip below 4.4 degrees Celsius, and it is not frost-tolerant.

However, it has been introduced to many parts of the world, including tropical countries of the Americas, and has naturalised in Brazil and other countries. It was mainly introduced for use as an improved pasture plant. 

Gamba grass was introduced into the Northern Territory of Australia in 1931 for trial as cattle feed, and was imported into the state of Queensland as a pasture grass in 1942, but was not planted on a large scale until about 1983. Almost all known locations in Queensland are in areas below  altitude that receive  annual rainfall.

Uses
A. gayanus is used as a pasture crop for cattle in many countries, including in far north Queensland in Australia. and has been used in Nigeria to reclaim land that has been overgrazed.

Strips of the grass planted in millet fields help to reduce wind erosion of the soil.

In some African countries, the stems are used as thatch.

Environmental impact
It has been declared a noxious species, officially a "Weed of national significance" in Australia since 2012, where it forms dense patches, out-competing native species and altering ecosystems. Areas of dense infestation have a significantly higher fire risk than native pastures. It is highly resistant to both cutting and fire, and ungrazed tussocks can generate very intense fires, leading to loss of tree cover and long-term environmental damage. It replaces native grasses, reducing natural biodiversity on ungrazed land. Being highly invasive, it can move into conservation areas, semi-urban residential land and mining leases.

In the NT, where there are large swathes of the plant between Darwin, Northern Territory and Katherine, conservationist Mitch Hart described gamba grass as a "triple threat": to people's lives, to the economy of Territory, and the potential destruction of Australia's northern savanna,

Control measures
WA, NT and Queensland have state legislation which prohibits planting of new plants, and compels land managers to control infestations.

David Bowman, a professor of environmental change biology at the University of Tasmania suggested in 2013 that the introduction of African elephants to Australia could be considered to control the gamba grass, as a rewilding trial.

The state of Western Australia, where infestations have not been as widespread as the NT and Queensland, established the Gamba Grass Eradication Program, a collaborative project supported by the Department of Biodiversity, Conservation and Attractions,  the Department of Primary Industries and Regional Development, El Questro Station and Kimberley Rangelands Biosecurity Association. The control program, started in 2011, has been highly successful, reducing the numbers of plants to 3,000 by 2018, and just 23 by 2020. They found only eight plants in the 2021 wet season. However it receives no funding from the federal government, and monitoring is necessary for a further five years to ensure that it does not spread again.

References

External links
Andropogon gayanus. National Weeds Strategy.
 

gayanus
Bunchgrasses of Africa
Flora of Africa
Forages